Novokiyevka is a rural locality (a selo) in Altaysky Selsoviet, Tabunsky District, Altai Krai, Russia. The population was 134 as of 2013. There are 3 streets.

Geography 
Novokiyevka is located 9 km southwest of Tabuny (the district's administrative centre) by road. Aleksandrovka is the nearest rural locality.

References 

Rural localities in Tabunsky District